The 2014–15 Football League Championship (referred to as the Sky Bet Championship for sponsorship reasons), was the eleventh season of the Football League Championship under its current title and the twenty-third season under its current league structure. The 2014–15 season began on 8 August 2014 and ended on 2 May 2015.

Bournemouth won the league on the last day of the season, confirming their place in the top flight for the first time in their history. Watford were runners-up and took their place in the Premier League for the first time since the 2006–07 season. Norwich were the final promoted team, bouncing straight back from their relegation the previous season by beating Middlesbrough 2–0 in the Play Off Final.

At the other end of the table, Blackpool were relegated in April having been cut adrift at the bottom of the table for much of the season. Wigan and Millwall were the other two teams to be relegated on the penultimate weekend of the season.

Changes from last season

Team changes
The following teams have changed division since the 2013–14 season.

To Championship
Promoted from League One
 Wolverhampton Wanderers
 Brentford
 Rotherham United
Relegated from Premier League
 Norwich City
 Fulham
 Cardiff City

From Championship
Relegated to League One
 Doncaster Rovers
 Barnsley
 Yeovil Town
Promoted to Premier League
 Leicester City
 Burnley
 Queens Park Rangers

Rule changes

Changes to the Championship's financial fair play system allow clubs: 
 Acceptable losses of £3 million during the 2014–15 season
 Acceptable shareholder equity investment of £3 million during the 2014–15 season (down from £5 million during the 2013–14 season).
 Sanctions for exceeding the allowances take effect from the set of accounts due to be submitted on 1 December 2014 for the 2013–14 season.

Team overview

Stadia and locations

Personnel and sponsoring

† After Marussia F1 rebranded as Manor F1 in 2015, Reading F.C. only displayed Waitrose sponsorship

Managerial changes

League table

Play-offs

Results

Top scorers

Hat-tricks

4 Player scored 4 goals

Monthly awards

References 

 
EFL Championship seasons
1
2
Eng